Tsushima Maru was a Japanese passenger/cargo ship that was sunk by the submarine USS Bowfin during World War II, while carrying hundreds of schoolchildren from Okinawa to Nagasaki.

Description
Tsushima Maru was carrying a large number of Japanese civilians evacuating from Okinawa to Kagoshima, Japan to escape the anticipated invasion of the Ryukyu Islands. Passengers included school children, as well as a few parents and school teachers. The ship was estimated to have carried 1,788 passengers. 254 survived. 1,534 passengers and crew died including 780 of the schoolchildren. Just 59 young boys and girls survived.

Sinking
On August 22, 1944, at between 10:00 p.m. and 10:30 p.m. local time, USS Bowfin attacked the convoy in which Tsushima Maru was sailing and sank her, close to the island of Akusekijima. Tsushima Maru Commemoration Association Survey Data (As of August 27, 2005), reported a total of 1,661 civilian evacuees, including 834 schoolchildren (of whom 775 were killed and approximately 59 survived the sinking). Shortly after the sinking a "gag order" was enforced by the Japanese government and families and survivors rarely spoke about the incident. The number of victims that have been identified by name, based on notifications from bereaved families (As of August 22, 2012), include 780 schoolchildren.

The ship was part of Convoy Namo 103, which consisted of the following ships:
 Tsushima Maru (passenger / cargo vessel)
 Kazuura Maru (listed as Waura Maru in some sources, assumed to be a cargo vessel)
 Gyōkū Maru (cargo vessel)
 Destroyer Hasu (Momi class)
 Gunboat Uji

Aftermath 
The wreck was located and identified in December 1997.

The sinking has been the subject of many articles and books published in Japan, as well as a good number of documentary broadcasts and even an animated feature film. Memorial ceremonies are held at sea at the approximate location of the sinking, and there are monuments in Naha City, Okinawa, and on Akuseki Island for those lost at sea.

Photos of identified students are on display at the Tsushima-maru Memorial Museum in Naha, Okinawa.

See also 
 List by death toll of ships sunk by submarines

References

External links 
 The Tsushima-maru Memorial Museum

World War II merchant ships of Japan
Ships sunk by American submarines
World War II shipwrecks in the Pacific Ocean
Battle of Okinawa
1914 ships
Ships built in Aberdeen
Maritime incidents in August 1944